Alisa Kirilyuk (born July 9, 1990) is a Russian sailor. She and Liudmila Dmitrieva placed 13th in the women's 470 event at the 2016 Summer Olympics.

References

1990 births
Living people
Russian female sailors (sport)
Olympic sailors of Russia
Sailors at the 2016 Summer Olympics – 470
Universiade medalists in sailing
Universiade gold medalists for Russia
Medalists at the 2011 Summer Universiade